Los Carayos was a French band which released four albums between 1986 and 1994. They were active mostly in Paris in the mid-1980s, but side interests of the musicians, notably of Manu Chao, did not allow the band to take off.

Their songs were largely of a parodic style, mixing rockabilly, punk, blues, and various genres of folk from throughout the world, especially country, and hispanic music. They were also influenced by Italian composer Ennio Morricone, who is famous for his work in movie soundtracks.

Name
Carallo (Galician spelling) or caralho (Portuguese one, both pronounced the same) are slang words with several meanings including "penis".

Members
The members of Los Carayos have gone on to achieve success in separate projects on the French and world music scenes. The group members include:
 François Hadji-Lazaro (also in Pigalle and Les Garçons Bouchers): vocals and diverse instruments
 Manu Chao (also being in the Hot Pants, then founding Mano Negra): vocals and guitar
 Schultz from Parabellum: vocals and guitar
 Tonio Chao (Manu's brother, also being in Chihuahua, then in Mano Negra)
 Alain from Les Wampas

Discography
 Hot Chicas (1986) - this album also featured music from Hot Pants
 Ils Ont Osé LIVE (1986) All or Nothing Rec. (D. Pasquier prod)
 Persistent et Signent (1987)
 Au prix où sont les courges (1994)

French musical groups
Musical groups from Paris